"Just One Kiss" is a song by American singer-songwriter Nick Carter. It was written by Carter, Jason Ingram and Daniel Muckala, and produced for Carter's second studio album, I'm Taking Off. "Just One Kiss" was released on January 28, 2011, as the album's first single, peaking at #12 on the Japan Hot 100 and #84 in Tokyo. The music video was directed by Danny Roew. The video contains scenes of Carter singing on the beach.

Track listing
 "Just One Kiss" (Radio Edit) - 3:34
 "Just One Kiss" (Club Mix) - 6:49
 "Just One Kiss" (Club Mix) (Radio Cut) - 3:46
 "Just One Kiss" (Official Video)

Charts

References

Songs about kissing
2011 singles
Nick Carter (musician) songs
Songs written by Jason Ingram
Songs written by Dan Muckala
Songs written by Nick Carter (musician)